David John "DJ" Uiagalelei (born April 17, 2001) is an American football quarterback for the Oregon State Beavers. He previously played for the Clemson Tigers before entering the transfer portal in 2022.

Early life and high school career
Uiagalelei, who is of Samoan descent, attended St. John Bosco High School in Bellflower, California. As a junior in 2018, he was the USA Today High School Offensive Player of the Year after throwing for 3,366 yards and 48 touchdowns. As a senior, he passed for 4,225 yards and 48 touchdowns. Uiagalelei also played baseball in high school.

A five-star recruit, Uiagalelei committed to Clemson University to play college football on May 5, 2019. He signed with them on December 18, 2019, and enrolled at Clemson on January 8, 2020.

College career

Freshman year

Uiagalelei started his first game for Clemson on October 31, 2020, against the Boston College Eagles. He replaced Trevor Lawrence, who was ruled out after testing positive for COVID-19. Uiagalelei completed 31 passes on 40 attempts for 342 yards and 2 touchdowns in leading Clemson to a comeback victory after being down by 18 points in the first half. He started a second game in place of Lawrence the following week on November 7, 2020, against undefeated Notre Dame—Clemson lost to the Irish in an overtime thriller, 47-40 despite another impressive performance by Uiagalelei, who completed 29 of 44 passes for 439 yards and 2 touchdowns.

Sophomore year
After Trevor Lawrence left for the NFL, Uiagalelei became Clemson's starting quarterback. He came into the season with much hype. The Tigers were ranked #3 in the nation in the preseason poll. He signed a deal with Dr. Pepper and Bojangles (restaurant) to appear in their commercials throughout the season. Clemson's first challenge of the season would come against the #5 Georgia Bulldogs. However, Uiagalelei played poorly, going 19-for-37 on pass attempts, threw for 178 yards, no touchdowns, and an interception. The game's only touchdown came from a pick six thrown by Uiagalelei. Clemson ultimately lost, 10-3.

Junior year 
After being benched in favor of Cade Klubnik during the ACC Championship, Uiagalelei announced his decision to enter the transfer portal on December 4, 2022.

Statistics

Personal life
Uiagalelei is a Christian. He attends a regular Bible study at Clemson and wears wristbands with Bible verses on them including Jeremiah 33:3, Philippians 4:13, Ephesians 6:10, and Romans 12:2.

References

External links

Clemson Tigers bio

2001 births
Living people
American football quarterbacks
American sportspeople of Samoan descent
Clemson Tigers football players
Players of American football from California
Oregon State Beavers football players